The White Mice are an abrasive, experimental, industrial, noise rock, and  noisegrind band from  Providence, Rhode Island. They consist of vocals, drums, bass, and electronics but, live, often have a rotation of guest members playing guitars, electronica, and custom, unidentifiable circuit-bent instruments.

History
Formed in late 2001, the band's first live performance on 10/31/01 took titular and visual inspiration from an old, open sewers era, British slang, for used tampons and tissue floating in a sewer. A slang still in use by plumbers today. They are known to use any level of humor, portmanteau terms and re-imagined puns thru out much of their work. (for example, they refer to their myspace as their "micespace") In time, developing their own unique slang language, boobonics, as they re-imagine post apocalyptic soundscapes  where a primal rats eye view of some kind of twisted alternate mutant human history, and reality, prevails. The strong sense of irreverence, humor and creativity in all their work brings them a growing  cult following as the band continues to play with the image and possibilities of the musical medium on record and continues to play and tour often.  Known for unforgettable live performances, they adorn bloody lab outfits and custom circuit-bent mouse masks, and create a harsh, furious sound, a mix of bass and drum heavy rhythms, thick with distortion and wound full of howling live electronic manipulation and blistering vocals."White Mice succeed where so many other performance based, noise oriented artists fail: the actually have great SONGS to back up their performances (and great performances they are, blood spattered mice costumes and all). Also, while some artists working in similar genres marinate themselves in pretensions, White Mice exude a disarmingly retarded sense of humor (their penchant for mice-ifying everything - song titles such as "mousSTASsh Ride," for example). For these reasons, I was looking forward to hearing White Mice's latest release, Excreamantraintraveinanus. First things first: this album sounds great. Somehow the crew at Machines with Magnets (Pawtucket, Rhode Island) captured White Mice's scuzzy, fuzzy sound without sacrificing any of the power or clarity that comes from the punishing volumes at which they play. Equally impressive, however, are the songs showcased here. "Gouda and Evil," which wraps strands of harsh noise around a hypnotic bass line and sledgehammer style drum beats, stands as one of the strongest moments on the album. The distorted, and at times vomitous, vocals are simply terrifying. Who knew a song about cheese could be so brutal? Many critics hear a heavy Melvins-influence in the songs of White Mice, a point which could be supported by the White Mice's love of heavy, sludgy sounds; however, what separates White Mice from this obvious influence is their almost painterly use of noise - they actually rock an oscillator to create whirling harsh soundscapes - and wickedly good basslines. Sure, plentiful grooves can be found in Melvins songs, but check out the busted, off kilter swagger of White Mice's "Fondleeza Mice." Your head will be nodding in no time. Some allege that many of White Mice's songs sound the same, but they miss the point: at their best, White Mice spin cohesive nightmares like no one else. Here's to another expertly crafted jaunt by these costume-clad masters of Malaise." (Michael Grigelevich) Skyscraper Magazine No. 28, Summer 2008
  
They have toured with Lightning Bolt, USA Is a Monster, Coughs, An Albatross, Skinny Puppy, Dj Scotch Egg, Bolz'n, Pleasurehorse, Suffering Bastard, and Athletic Automaton.

They have self-released several records, including "Mouse of Mendes" and a Christmas album entitled "Do They Know It's Christmice?" before being signed to Load Records, where they recorded and released two more albums. Further records have been released on the Blossoming Noise label of Atlanta Georgia, as well as several independent labels.

Members
Current
MOUSEaTONGUE - bass, vocals
ANONyMOUSE - oscillator, theremins, kaoss, samples, tape machines
PHLEgMMY KILLMICESTER - drums

Former

AutomRATon - Guitard
CHeddie - sawblades
CoCHeese - drums
Euronymouse - Rat Skins
Euronynonymouse - Tapes
Ganjameice - drums
Maus Kinski - Saxophone, zither, chair, cheesus, guitard, contact mic, misc.
Mouseferatu - bass, vocals
MoustRATdumbass - Guitard
Ol' DuRTY MOUSE TURD a.k.a. Big Baby Cheesus - Electronics, Hype, Chaos
Swiss Miss a.k.a. The Virgin Scary - backup
The Chesident - Traps
Verminator X - Guitard
Vincent Mice - Guitard

Discography
Studio albums

Live albums

Compilation albums

Singles

References

External links
White Mice at MySpace
[ White Mice] at AllMusic
Load Records

American sludge metal musical groups
American grindcore musical groups
Musical groups from Rhode Island
American industrial music groups
Load Records artists